Lithuania–Turkey relations are the foreign relations between Lithuania and Turkey. Turkey recognized Lithuania on July 28, 1922, and diplomatic relations were established on the same day. The Turkish ambassador to Estonia in Tallinn was also accredited to Lithuania. Following USSR occupation and annexation of Estonia, Latvia and Lithuania, the Turkish embassy in Tallinn closed on September 5, 1940. Turkey, however, never recognized the Soviet annexation of Lithuania.

Following the revelation that Gorbachev had authorized Vilnius Massacre, Turkey renewed recognition of Lithuania’s independence and restored diplomatic relations on September 3, 1991.

Military cooperation
Turkey cooperates closely with Lithuania in military affairs and provides personnel to the NATO Center of Excellence in Vilnius. In the past, Turkey trained Lithuanian military units who served< as UN peacekeepers in the former Yugoslavia.

Economic relations 
Trade volume between the two countries was US$687 million in 2018 (Turkish exports/imports: 277/410 million USD).

Resident diplomatic missions
 Lithuania has an embassy in Ankara.
 Turkey has an embassy in Vilnius.

See also 

 Foreign relations of Lithuania
 Foreign relations of Turkey

References

External links
Library of Congress / Federal Research Division / Country Studies / Area Handbook Series / Latvia (Estonia, Latvia, Lithuania) / Bibliography

 
Lithuania–Turkey relations
Turkey
Bilateral relations of Turkey